The Sperrlutter is a river in Lower Saxony, Germany, a roughly -long tributary of the Oder between Sankt Andreasberg and Bad Lauterberg in the Harz Mountains.

It flows initially south through the village of Silberhütte, where it is joined by the Wäschegrund. Then, it is joined by the Breitenbeek, the largest tributary of the Sperrlutter.

See also
List of rivers of Lower Saxony

References

Rivers of Lower Saxony
Rivers of the Harz
Rivers of Germany